Soccer from around the world is available in Canada on many different television networks and channels.  The following is a list of top leagues and tournaments from around the world and the corresponding channel that has coverage in Canada, as of the 2021–22 season:

Programming

Soccer in fiction on Canadian television
 21 Thunder

See also
Sports broadcasting contracts in Canada

References